The Drake & Josh soundtrack (also known as Drake & Josh: Songs from and inspired by the hit TV show, as indicated on the album cover) is the soundtrack by Drake Bell and various artists that features many of the songs from the Nickelodeon series Drake & Josh. It also features songs that weren't used in the show but were inspired by it.

The soundtrack also includes the theme song for the series, "I Found a Way" written by show star Drake Bell and Michael "Backhouse Mike" Corcoran.

With the exception of "Soul Man", the contributions on the soundtrack by Drake Bell are also on his debut album Telegraph (2005).

The soundtrack charted at #178 on the Billboard 200 and sold 1,260 copies in its first week.

Track listing

2005 soundtrack albums
Drake & Josh
Television soundtracks